Metadelphax propinqua is a species of delphacid planthoppers in the family Delphacidae. It is found in Africa, Australia, the Caribbean, Europe, Northern Asia (excluding China), Central America, North America, Oceania, South America, and Southern Asia. It is an introduced species in the Nearctic and Neotropic.

References

 Gonzon, Anthony T., and Charles R. Bartlett (2007). "Systematics of Hadropygos n.g., Metadelphax Wagner and New World Toya Distant (Hemiptera: Delphacidae)". Transactions of the American Entomological Society, vol. 133, no. 3+4, 205-277.

Further reading

 Arnett, Ross H. (2000). American Insects: A Handbook of the Insects of America North of Mexico. CRC Press.

External links

 NCBI Taxonomy Browser, Metadelphax propinqua

Insects described in 1866
Delphacini